Jefferson Township is an inactive township in Osage County, in the U.S. state of Missouri.

Jefferson Township was erected in 1841, taking its name from Thomas Jefferson, third President of the United States.

References

Townships in Missouri
Townships in Osage County, Missouri
Jefferson City metropolitan area